Sar Huyeh (also Romanized as Sar Hūyeh and Sar-e Hūyah; also known as Sarhūyān and Sar-i-Huyān) is a village in Zhavarud-e Gharbi Rural District, Kalatrazan District, Sanandaj County, Kurdistan Province, Iran. At the 2006 census, its population was 1,066, in 260 families. The village is populated by Kurds.

References 

Towns and villages in Sanandaj County
Kurdish settlements in Kurdistan Province